Republican Party of Crimea (Respublikanska partiya Krymu; , Respublikanskaya partiya Kryma) was a regional separatist political party of Ukraine, that was created in 1992 based on the Republican Movement of Crimea and fought for the incorporation of Crimea into the Russian Federation.

Historical background

The Republican Movement of Crimea (RDK) was founded in 1991 in the aftermath of the Ukrainian Declaration of Independence.  Its goal was to revive the republican status of the region and its sovereignty. 

It has been alleged that the movement was financed by the local company "Impeks-55" and supported by a criminal gang "Bashmaki" (after its leader Bashmakov). With the help of the Black Sea Fleet administration, in February 1992 the movement initiated gathering of signatures for a referendum for Crimea in the new Soviet Union.

References

External links
Russians of Crimea will always be with Russia
Stages of creation the Russian community of Crimea. Russian Unity website.
Our goal - protection of values of the Russian world. Russian Unity website.

1992 establishments in Ukraine
1995 disestablishments in Ukraine
Defunct political parties in Ukraine
Political parties disestablished in 1995
Political parties established in 1992
Political parties in Crimea
Regionalist parties in Ukraine
Russian nationalism in Ukraine
Russian nationalist parties
Russian political parties in Ukraine